St Mary's Church is a Church of England parish church in Old Amersham, Amersham in Buckinghamshire, England. The church is a grade I listed building.

History
The site of St Mary's Church has had Christian associations for many centuries. Early missionary monks of St Augustine and St Birinus travelled via the Roman Road Akeman Street, converting the local population to Christianity and baptising them in the River Misbourne. A place of worship has existed on this site since around 1140 A.D. The present church dates from the 13th century with additions in the 14th and 15th centuries,  when the church was extended.

The parish has connections with the persecution of the Lollards in the early 1500s when a group of locals known as the Amersham Martyrs were burned at the stake on the hill overlooking the old town. The Amersham Martyrs Memorial was placed on a hill overlooking the church in 1931. In 1553, Scottish reformer John Knox preached his last sermon at Amersham before going into exile to flee the wrath of Queen Mary.

The patrons of the parish are the Drake family, the Lords of the Manor of Amersham, related to Sir Francis Drake. Around 1637, Sir William Drake purchased the Borough of Amersham from the Earl of Bedford. There are numerous memorials to Drake family members in St Mary's Church.

Several descendants of the Drakes have served as rector of the parish, including Rev. Edward Drake, who commissioned a major  restoration of the church in 1890, and the external appearance dates from this time.

The bells are still rung in the church tower.

On 22 December 1958, the church was designated a grade I listed building.

Present day
The Church of England parish of Amersham is part of the Archdeaconry of Buckingham in the Diocese of Oxford.

Notable burials
The body of the murderer Ruth Ellis was reburied in the churchyard extension of St Mary's Church. The headstone in the churchyard was inscribed "Ruth Hornby 1926–1955". Her son, Andy, destroyed the headstone shortly before he committed suicide in 1982.

Gallery

See also

 Amersham Museum, also in Old Amersham

References

Amersham
Amersham
Amersham